Thomas R. Schreiner (born April 24, 1954) is an American Reformed New Testament scholar. He is the James Buchanan Harrison Professor of New Testament Interpretation at the Southern Baptist Theological Seminary. He previously taught at Bethel University and Azusa Pacific University. He is also co-chairman of the Christian Standard Bible's Translation Oversight Committee and is the New Testament editor of the ESV Study Bible.
Schreiner has degrees from Western Oregon University, Western Seminary, and Fuller Theological Seminary.

Schreiner has written commentaries on Romans, Hebrews, First and Second Peter, and Jude. In 2014, he served as president of the Evangelical Theological Society.

From 2001 to 2015, Schreiner served as the Pastor of Preaching at Clifton Baptist Church in Louisville, Kentucky. He currently serves as an elder at Clifton. His son, Patrick, is also a New Testament scholar, teaching at Midwestern Baptist Theological Seminary.

In 2019, a Festschrift was published in his honor. God’s Glory Revealed in Christ: Essays on Biblical Theology in Honor of Thomas R. Schreiner included contributions from Clinton E. Arnold, D. A. Carson, Simon Gathercole, Russell D. Moore, John Piper, and Bruce Ware.

Works

Books

as Editor
 
 
  - new edition of the 1995 title

Articles and Chapters

References

External links
On My Shelf: Life and Books with Tom Schreiner, The Gospel Coalition

Living people
American biblical scholars
New Testament scholars
Western Oregon University alumni
Fuller Theological Seminary alumni
Western Seminary alumni
Azusa Pacific University faculty
Bethel University (Minnesota) faculty
Southern Baptist Theological Seminary faculty
Bible commentators
1954 births
American Baptist theologians